Rhamdia zongolicensis (common name: Zongolica catfish) is a species of three-barbeled catfish endemic to Mexico. Its specific name refers to Zongolica, the area in Veracruz state where it occurs. It is a cave fish similar to Rhamdia laticauda and Rhamdia reddelli, and at times considered a junior synonym of the former.

Habitat
Rhamdia zongolicensis is only known to occur in a single cave, Cueva del Túnel (Cueva del Ostoc), where it lives in stagnant pools.

Description
Rhamdia zongolicensis grows to at least about  standard length. It is related to the surface-dwelling Rhamdia laticauda, considered to be its sister species. Because the surface species is nocturnal, and thereby adapted to darkness, the cave species shows only few new adaptations: elongated barbels and extreme ability to withstand starvation (at least seven months under experimental conditions). It also shows reduced pigmentation and smaller eyes.

Rhamdia zongolicensis is morphologically indistinguishable from Rhamdia reddelli. This is interpreted as resulting from convergent evolution.

References

Heptapteridae
Cave fish
Freshwater fish of Mexico
Endemic fish of Mexico
Taxonomy articles created by Polbot
Fish described in 1993
Fauna of the Sierra Madre de Oaxaca